Shadmehr District is a district (bakhsh) in Mahvelat County, Razavi Khorasan province, Iran. At the 2006 census, its population was 15,857, in 4,229 families.  ThedDistrict has one city: Shadmehr.  The district has two rural districts (dehestan): Azghand Rural District and Mahvelat-e Shomali Rural District.

References 

Districts of Razavi Khorasan Province
Mahvelat County